Lego Stranger Things was a Lego theme based on the 2016 Netflix sci-fi horror series of the same name. It was licensed from Netflix. The theme was first introduced in May 2019 and was discontinued in December 2022.

Overview
Lego Stranger Things was based on the Stranger Things 2016 Netflix sci-fi horror series, which focuses on the investigation into the disappearance of a young boy (Will Byers) amid supernatural events occurring around the town, including the appearance of a girl with psychokinetic abilities (Eleven). Lego Stranger Things aimed to recreate the main characters in Lego form, including Barbara "Barb" Holland, Eleven / Jane Hopper, Mike Wheeler, Lucas Sinclair, Dustin Henderson, Will Byers, Joyce Byers, Chief Jim Hopper and the Demogorgon.

Development
In 2019, Lego Senior Model Designer Justin Ramsden discussed the process behind developing the intricate build that is The Upside Down (set number: 75810) and explained, "We were really lucky to work closely with Netflix, so they gave us loads of behind the scenes images and plans. You had the TV show out there for everyone to watch and rewatch, so we had plenty of visual goodness showing how they would set up the house in the show, where they would leave a cup on the side when Joyce is talking, or where the cushion goes on the sofa, so really mundane stuff, but that is what I love as a fan, where you get this behind the scene look. We were not shown anything of Season 3 really – which is cool because it leaves it exciting for me, it means I get to build the set in the run-up to the new series and get really hyped for it."

Lego Senior Model Designer Justin Ramsden discussed the character selection for the set and explained, "That is the beauty of the show, it was really hard to narrow it down. We were lucky enough to work with Netflix to decide which characters are relevant, for the scene. We also got the chance to create three new elements for the set as well, they are headgear for the Demogorgon, a hair piece for Dustin and also the hair for Will. It is fantastic to bring newness into the LEGO assortment and stuff that just really nails the characters’ aesthetics, it is really great."

Lego Senior Model Designer Justin Ramsden discussed about the Stranger Things brief and explained, "First steps vary designer to designer. As long as we nail the brief and hit the timings, you can work however you like. Some LEGO designers like to use their computers, others use pen and paper, but I’m old fashioned – I like to pour bricks onto the floor and get building. That’s what the consumer will be doing!" and continued, "With the Stranger Things set, we started off with a concept sketch. There was an elite team of LEGO designers that joined together to discuss what this model could be. From that meetings, one of the concept designers drew a quick sketch and that became the basis for what the model could look like. We followed the sketch and had a close dialogue with Netflix. There was some back and forth with them, and we did iterations that made the set more stable, more playable and with more functions."

Launch
In 2019, Lego Stranger Things theme was launched at The LEGO Store in Flatiron District, New York. Later, it also launched in the UK at Lego Store Leicester Square, London. As part of the marketing campaign, The Lego Group released The Upside Down (set number: 75810) based on a version of the Byers' home.

Characters

 Barbara "Barb" Holland: An introvert and best friend of Nancy Wheeler. She is concerned that her friendship with Nancy may be threatened by Nancy's relationship with Steve. Barb is one of the first victims of the Demogorgon.
 Eleven / Jane Hopper: A young girl with telepathic and psychokinetic abilities and a limited vocabulary. Her real name is Jane, and she is the biological daughter of Terry Ives.
 Mike Wheeler: A middle child of Karen and Ted Wheeler, brother of Nancy and Holly, and one of three friends of Will Byers. He is an intelligent and conscientious student and is committed to his friends. He develops romantic feelings for Eleven.
 Lucas Sinclair: One of Will's friends. He is wary of Eleven but later befriends her.
 Dustin Henderson: One of Will Byers' friends. His cleidocranial dysplasia causes him to lisp.
 Will Byers: The son of Joyce Byers and younger brother of Jonathan Byers. He is captured by a monster from the "Upside Down", an alternate dimension discovered by Hawkins Laboratory scientists.
 Joyce Byers: The mother of Will and Jonathan Byers. She is divorced from Lonnie Byers.
 Chief Jim Hopper: Chief of Hawkins Police Department. After his young daughter Sara died of cancer, Hopper divorced and lapsed into alcoholism. Eventually he grows to be more responsible, saving Joyce's son as well as taking Eleven as his adopted daughter. It is revealed that he and Joyce have feelings for each other.
 Demogorgon: Predatory creatures from the Upside Down that serve as the Mind Flayer's initial invasion force, murderous and violent with limited intelligence. Demogorgons start off as slug-like creatures that are incubated in a victim's body, growing into a tadpole-like creature and gradually molting into an adolescent form called a "Demodog" before fully maturing.

Toy line

Construction sets
According to Bricklink, The Lego Group released two Lego sets as part of Lego Stranger Things theme. The product line was eventually discontinued by the end of December 2022.

In 2019, The Lego Group had a partnership with Netflix. The Lego Group introduced a Stranger Things set called The Upside Down (set number: 75810), based on a version of the Byers' home and its replica in the Upside Down was released in May 2019. The largest set consists of 2287 pieces with 8 minifigures. The Byers' house had 4 rooms including a front porch with furniture, living room, dining room and Will's bedroom. It also included Chief Jim Hopper's police truck and variety of accessories. The set included Lego minifigures of Eleven, Mike Wheeler, Lucas Sinclair, Dustin Henderson, Will Byers, Joyce Byers, Chief Jim Hopper and the Demogorgon. The sets were designed primarily for adults with an age rating of 16+ or above. The set was designed by Lego Senior Model Designer Justin Ramsden. In 2021, The Lego Group announced The Upside Down (set number: 75810) was retired on 31 December 2021.

In July 2019, San Diego Comic-Con had announced that an exclusive Barb minifigure would be given away to the winners.

In February 2022, a Demogorgon minifigure Keyring was released and was retired in August 2022.

Lego BrickHeadz sets 
On 1 February 2022, a set named Demogorgon and Eleven (set number: 40549) were released as part of the Lego BrickHeadz theme. The set consists of 192 pieces and 2 baseplates. The set was retired in December 2022.

Web shorts
The product line was accompanied by a series of animated short films that was released on YouTube.
 Welcome to The Upside Down was an official web short was released on YouTube on 15 May 2019 that inspired by both The Upside Down (set number: 75810) as well as the Stranger Things 2016 Netflix sci-fi horror series.
 The Upside Down 75810 Collector’s Item was an official web short was released on YouTube on 1 June 2019 that inspired by both The Upside Down (set number: 75810) as well as the Stranger Things 2016 Netflix sci-fi horror series. It features Lucas Sinclair, Dustin Henderson, Mike Wheeler, Eleven, Joyce Byers and Chief Hopper are ready to banish the Demogorgon from the Byers’ home.

Awards and nominations
In 2020, The Upside Down (set number: 75810) was awarded "Toy of the Year" and also "Specialty Toy of the Year" by the Toy Association.

See also 
 Lego Monster Fighters
 Lego Ghostbusters
 Lego Scooby-Doo
 Lego Hidden Side
 Lego BrickHeadz

References

External links 
 Official website

Lego themes
Products introduced in 2019
Stranger Things (TV series)
Products and services discontinued in 2022